Michalis Manias (born 20 February 1990) is a Greek professional footballer who plays as a striker and currently plays for Super League Greece 2 club P.A.E. G.S. Diagoras.

Club career
Manias started his career in AE Moschatou and in Rouf, before being transferred to Apollon Smyrnis.

After an impressive 2012–13 season scoring 18 times, he signed for Aris. At Aris, it took him 13 match days to score his first goal, the equalizer in a 2–2 draw with Panthrakikos. Manias finished the season with 7 goals and 1 assist in 33 games. He was considered as one of team's best players in a season where they managed to collect enough points to stay in the Superleague. At the end of the season Manias was released two years early from the end of his contract because Aris self relegated them self to the 3rd division and he requested to have his contract terminated, as he wanted to continue playing in the top division.

Manias signed a two-year contract with PAS Giannina. He scored his first goal in the 12th round against Niki Volos, also getting an assist in the same game. He had many good performances during the year like scoring against PAOK, a brace against Panthrakikos and the winner over Olympiakos. Manias was considered a major hit at PAS Giannina with 9 goals and 2 assist in 34 games. Manias started the 2015–16 campaign as the leader of the club's offence. At the end of the season he had 10 goals and 3 assists, attracting the interest of the German club Augsburg with his contract expiring at the end of season.

On 8 June 2016, Manias signed a two-year contract with Belgian Pro League club Westerlo for an undisclosed fee. On 13 August 2016, he scored his first goal with the club in a 2–1 home loss against Eupen.

Asteras Tripolis
On 30 December 2016, after just six months at the club, he was released from his contract by Westerlo and returned to Greece Asteras Tripolis. On 4 January 2017, he made his debut with the club as a starter in a 2–1 way loss against champions Olympiakos. On 5 April 2017, he netted a hat-trick, including one penalty, against AEL, helping his club to a 4–1 away win in their effort to avoid relegation. On 23 April 2017, in a crucial Superleague game against Veria, he netted a second hat-trick in a month, but he didn't not succeed to help his club to acquire a positive result, as they faced a 4–3 away loss. On 16 September 2017, he opened the score, in a 1–1 away draw against champions Olympiakos. It was his first goal for the 2017–18 season. On 1 October 2017, he scored the second goal sealing a 2–0 home win against AEK Athens, the first in the 2017–18 season. On 2 December 2017, he scored a brace being the MVP of the game sealing a 4–0 home win against Kerkyra., and a week later he scored a goal in a 3–1 away win against Apollon Smyrnis. On 14 January 2018, he scored a brace in a 3–1 home win game against AEL. On 10 March 2018, Manias put the visitors, who beat high-flying PAOK 3–2 last weekend, ahead in the 69th minute in a 1–1 away draw against Panathinaikos. On 2 April he opened the score in a 4–0 home win game against Platanias, helping his club in its effort to win a ticket to the next year's Europa League. On 22 April 2018, Manias scored a brace sealing a 3–1 away win against Kerkyra in the battle to win the Europa League ticket against rivals Xanthi. On 5 May 2018, in a comfortable 2–0 away victory over Panetolikos, the Greek marksman scored and his 12th league goal of what has been an incredible season, as Asteras Tripolis will participate in the UEFA Europa League qualifiers next season.

On 22 September 2018, Manias helped the club to collect their first points of the fledgling 2018–19 season  after seeing off fellow early strugglers Apollon Smyrnis 2–0 at the Theodoros Kolokotronis stadium, by scoring with a wonderful kick after Martín Tonso's assist. It was his first goal for the season. On 6 October 2018, he opened the score in a 1–1 home draw against Panathinaikos. On 22 October 2018, he scored in a 3–2 away loss against Atromitos. On 24 November 2018, in new coach Georgios Paraschos’ debut, Manias scored a goal in the last minute of the game sealing a vital 2–0 home win game in his club's effort to avoid relegation.

Pogoń Szczecin
On 17 May 2019, Manias signed a three years' contract with Ekstraklasa club Pogoń Szczecin for an undisclosed fee.

Anorthosis
On 19 August 2020, Manias signed contract with Cypriot Club Anorthosis Famagusta.

Olympiakos Nicosia

On 7th January 2022, Manias signed a contract with Olympiakos Nicosia un til the end of the 2021–22 season.

Kitchee
On 28 September 2022, Manias signed a contract with Hong Kong Premier League club Kitchee. He scored 2 goals in his first two appearances for Kitchee, one in Hong Kong Premier League and one in Sapling Cup group stage.

On 31 December 2022, Manias left the club.

International career
On 15 May 2018, he made his debut with the national team in a 2–0 friendly loss game against Saudi Arabia.

Career statistics

References

External links
 
Myplayer.gr Profile

1990 births
Living people
Greek footballers
Greek expatriate footballers
Greece international footballers
Association football forwards
Super League Greece players
Football League (Greece) players
Belgian Pro League players
Ekstraklasa players
Cypriot First Division players
Hong Kong Premier League players
Apollon Smyrnis F.C. players
Aris Thessaloniki F.C. players
PAS Giannina F.C. players
K.V.C. Westerlo players
Asteras Tripolis F.C. players
Pogoń Szczecin players
Anorthosis Famagusta F.C. players
Kitchee SC players
Greek expatriates in Belgium
Expatriate footballers in Belgium
Expatriate footballers in Poland
Expatriate footballers in Cyprus
Expatriate footballers in Hong Kong
People from Rhodes
Sportspeople from the South Aegean